Justice Page may refer to:

 Alan Page, associate justice of the Minnesota Supreme Court
 Ambrose Page, associate justice of the Rhode Island Supreme Court
 E. M. Page, associate justice of the Oregon Supreme Court for less than a year
 Elwin Lawrence Page, associate justice of the New Hampshire Supreme Court
 Henry Page, associate justice of the Maryland Court of Appeals
 William W. Page, associate justice of the Oregon Supreme Court for four months